The Lead Camp Limestone is a geologic formation in the San Andres Mountains of New Mexico. It preserves fossils dating back to the middle Pennsylvanian.

Description
The Lead Camp Limestone consists of 75% medium- to dark-gray cherty limestone and 21-24% calcareous shale. The base of the formation contains minor sandstone and conglomerate. The limestone forms prominent cliffs capping the southern San Andres Mountains. The formation rests unconformably on the Lake Valley Limestone to the south and conformably on the Sandia Formation to the north.

Deposition began in the late Morrowan (Bashkirian) to the south, spread to the north in the Atokan (early Moscovian, and continued into the Missourian (Kasimovian) Age.

Fossils
The formation contains marine fossils in the calcareous shale beds. It contains fusulinids characteristic of the middle Pennsylvanian.

History of investigation
The formation was first defined by George Bachman and Donald Myers in 1969, for exposures near the confluence of Lead Camp and San Andres Canyons.

See also

 List of fossiliferous stratigraphic units in New Mexico
 Paleontology in New Mexico

Footnotes

References
 
 

Carboniferous formations of New Mexico
Carboniferous southern paleotropical deposits
Limestone formations of the United States